The 2018 Go Bowling 250 was a NASCAR Xfinity Series race held on September 21, 2018 at Richmond Raceway in Richmond, Virginia. Contested over 250 laps on the  D-shaped short track, it was the 27th race of the 2018 NASCAR Xfinity Series season, and the first race of the Playoffs. This was also the last race for Dale Earnhardt Jr., who had already retired from full-time racing in the previous year.

Entry list

Practice

First practice

Final practice

Qualifying

Qualifying results

Race

Stage Results

Stage 1

Stage 2

Final Stage Results

Stage 3

References

Go Bowling 250
NASCAR races at Richmond Raceway
Go Bowling 250
2018 NASCAR Xfinity Series